John Dies at the End is a comic horror novel written by David Wong that was first published online as a webserial beginning in 2001, then as an edited manuscript in 2004, and a printed paperback in 2007, published by Permuted Press. An estimated 70,000 people read the free online versions before they were removed in September 2008. Thomas Dunne Books published the story with additional material as a hardcover on September 29, 2009. The book was followed by three sequels, This Book Is Full of Spiders in 2012, What The Hell Did I Just Read in 2017, and If This Book Exists, You're in the Wrong Universe, in 2022. A film adaptation by Don Coscarelli was released in 2012.

Plot summary 
Dave and John are a pair of paranormal investigators who live in an unnamed Midwestern town (referred to in the novel as "Undisclosed"). Dave meets reporter Arnie in a local restaurant and recounts the origin of his and John's unusual abilities.

The main story begins with Dave and John at a party, where John is performing with his band. Dave leaves the party early and John meets up with him later at Denny's, where John reveals that he has taken a drug known as "soy sauce" and shows Dave a syringe containing the drug. Dave pockets the syringe. Later, Dave accidentally injects himself with the drug in his pocket and begins to feel the effects.  

Local police detective Lawrence Appleton informs Dave that everyone from the party except himself are either dead or missing, which turns out not to be true. John and Dave gather the remaining survivors of the party and they head to the Luxor Hotel in Las Vegas to meet with Albert Marconi, an expert in the paranormal.  En route to Las Vegas, Detective Appleton kidnaps the group, until he and one other person are taken over by a malevolent force known as the Shadow Men, forcing the rest of the group to kill them. After a climactic battle scene at the Luxor, John and Dave return home and resume their lives.

One year later, Dave and John begin investigating various strange phenomena, all caused by the Shadow Men. At one point they build a bomb, which is eaten by Dave's Irish setter Molly. While tracking the Shadow Men to an abandoned mall, John and Dave are transported to another dimension, where they are greeted by followers of a godlike being called Korrok, who commands the Shadow Men in a bid to conquer all possible universes for consumption and amusement via acts of mass genocide and torture. They are informed that through their use of the Soy Sauce, they are now the chosen vectors through which the Shadow Men will invade their world. Escaping their captors, the two flee with Molly just as the bomb detonates.

An incredulous Arnie refuses to believe Dave, even after being shown one of the monsters the Shadow Men summoned. Dave reveals the real Arnie dead in the trunk of his car. Arnie panics and disappears.

In an epilogue, John and Dave find another dimensional portal inhabited by members of a paramilitary organization, who tell the two friends they are chosen ones who will save them. Annoyed, John and Dave leave, and watch as a group of teenagers travel through the portal and save the dimension.

Characters

David Wong: Author surrogate and the novel's protagonist. Dave narrates the novel from the first-person perspective. Dave is self-conscious and sarcastic, thus his narration is unreliable as the truth (he says he has been "mostly" honest with Arnie, and thus the reader).  Dave is a slacker who works various minimum-wage jobs in his local town; during the timeline of the story he works at a video rental store.

John: Long-time best friend of Dave. John is frequently under the influence of various drugs, and Dave's need to rescue John from various difficult situations propels the plot forward.  His band is playing at the party that opens the main storyline.

Molly:  Molly is David's adoptive dog, an "Irish rust dog", whose tags indicate she previously belonged to the Sullivan family.  Dave finds Molly at the party at the beginning of the main storyline. When Dave tries to return the dog, they refuse to receive it, and it follows Dave around for most of the story.

Arnie Blondestone: A journalist investigating paranormal affairs, his interview with Dave provides a framing story for the main events of the novel.

Robert Marley: A drug dealer present at the party at the outset of the story, he provides a drug known as "soy sauce" that either kills its users or gives them supernatural powers.  

Jennifer Lopez, "Big" Jim Sullivan, Fred Chu:  Three party-goers who were all present at the party at the start of the story that sets the plot in motion.  The three of them join John and Dave on the trek to Las Vegas in Book 1.  "Big" Jim and Fred are killed in the events, while Jennifer (whom Dave has had a crush on since high school) ends up dating Dave for a while during the period between the two main storylines.

Amy Sullivan: Timid sister of "Big" Jim Sullivan.

Detective Lawrence "Morgan Freeman" Appleton: Detective in the Undisclosed Police Department, he starts investigating the deaths of several of the party goers, but becomes obsessed with the case, and changes from an investigator to trying to actively stop the evil that is operating in Undisclosed.  He reminds Dave of a famous African-American actor, which Dave mistakenly thinks is Morgan Freeman.

Doctor Albert Marconi: A former priest, and current lecturer on Paranormal Activities, he acts as an advisor of sorts to Dave and John.

Danny Wexler: Local sportscaster whose possession by The Shadow Men provides the inciting incident in Book 2.

Krissy Lovelace: Danny's neighbor who initiates the main investigation in Book 2.

Korrok: Believed to be an evil deity worshiped by several different cultures in human history, Korrok serves as the novel's major antagonist, with many of the demons encountered by David and John throughout the novel acting as his servants.  Korrok is depicted in many ways, both physical and metaphorical.

"Shitload": One of Korrok's supernatural minions. Shitload's natural form consists of a swarm of small, white insectoids comparable to rods described in cryptozoological theories.

Reception
Reviewer Bryan Gatchell considered it "a horror novel parody," saying, "The story combined the horror of the writings of H. P. Lovecraft and the surrealism of Heironymus [sic] Bosch painting with the early 20s (i.e., their age) asininity of its two main protagonists, David Wong and John... [T]hey can see things no other human can see such as shadow men, demons, floating worms, obscene fast food murals, ghost doors, men observing them through the television and dog-sized, wig-wearing, scorpion-like creatures... Wong is much more at home when it comes to the humorous aspects of the story... Strangely enough, the best moment of the novel has neither to do with horror (in the traditional sense) or humor. The novel becomes the most gripping when David describes a violent incident as a high school student. The rest of the novel is amusing, but at this moment, the novel breaks away from its jokey Internet origins and seems to come into its own as a genuinely good book."

The book received a positive review in The Guardian, with reviewer Eric Brown comparing it to the works of Philip K. Dick, Kurt Vonnegut and Hunter S. Thompson and writing "it may be a farrago of nonsense, but it's also unputdownable thanks to great narrative pace and its pair of likeable layabouts".

A review in Publishers Weekly was positive, saying "the book's smart take on fear manages to tap into readers' existential dread on one page, then have them laughing the next".

A review in Kirkus Reviews criticised the writing as "clunky" but ultimately praised the book, concluding "when it’s funny, it's laugh-out-loud funny, yet when the situation calls for chills, it provides them in spades".

Sandra Scholes, writing a featured review on SF Site recommended the book, stating "for those who like to delve into the realms of the unreal and offbeat, this is a really good one".

Sequels
A sequel to the book, This Book Is Full of Spiders, was published on October 2, 2012. It originally had the working title of John and Dave and the Fifth Wall before Wong announced the official title. Part of the book was originally hosted on the official website under the title of John and Dave and the Temple of X'al'naa'thuthuthu, but was removed from the site. Wong later re-posted the excerpt on the website in February 2009, but removed it the following year.

A third book in the series was released on October 3, 2017, under the title What the Hell Did I Just Read: A Novel of Cosmic Horror.

The fourth book in the series, If This Book Exists, You're in the Wrong Universe was released in October 2022. This book was released under Wong's real name, Jason Pargin, as have recent paperback editions of the earlier books.

Film adaptation

Director Don Coscarelli purchased film rights to the book; and subsequently wrote and directed the film adaptation.

Filming began on October 21, 2010. The movie stars Paul Giamatti as Arnie Blondestone and Clancy Brown as Dr. Marconi, with Giamatti also helping to produce. Actors Chase Williamson and Rob Mayes play the lead roles of Dave and John, respectively.

The movie premiered at the 2012 Sundance Film Festival on January 24, 2012 and was released as an independent theatrical film the following day.

References

External links
 
"Web Posts Earn Deals For New Authors", Publishers Weekly, October 6, 2008
 The Second Supper review of "John Dies at the End" Dead Link 23-10-13

2007 American novels
American comedy novels
American horror novels
Novels first published in serial form
American novels adapted into films
Novels set in the Midwestern United States
Novels about parallel universes
Novels set in the Las Vegas Valley
Works published under a pseudonym
Horror comedy
2007 debut novels
Books by David Wong (writer)
Novels first published online